The first season of the American action television series Arrow premiered on The CW on October 10, 2012, at 8:00 pm (ET) and concluded on May 15, 2013, with a total of 23 episodes, after the network ordered a full season on October 22, 2012. The series is based on the DC Comics character Green Arrow, a costumed crime-fighter created by Mort Weisinger and George Papp, and is set in the Arrowverse, sharing continuity with other Arrowverse television series. The showrunners for this season were Greg Berlanti, Marc Guggenheim and Andrew Kreisberg. Stephen Amell stars as Oliver Queen, with principal cast members Katie Cassidy as Laurel Lance, Colin Donnell as Tommy Merlyn, David Ramsey as John Diggle, Willa Holland as Thea Queen, Susanna Thompson as Moira Queen, and Paul Blackthorne as Quentin Lance.

The series follows billionaire playboy Oliver Queen (Stephen Amell), who claimed to have spent five years shipwrecked on Lian Yu, a mysterious island in the North China Sea, before returning home to Starling City (later renamed "Star City") to fight crime and corruption as a secret vigilante whose weapon of choice is a bow and arrow. In the first season, Oliver returns to Starling City and is reunited with his mother, Moira (Susanna Thompson), his sister, Thea (Willa Holland), and his friend, Tommy Merlyn (Colin Donnell). Oliver rekindles his relationships, while spending his nights hunting down and sometimes killing criminals as a hooded vigilante, known as The Hood. He uncovers Malcolm Merlyn's (John Barrowman) conspiracy to destroy "The Glades", a poorer section of the city that has become overridden with crime. John Diggle (David Ramsey) and Felicity Smoak (Emily Bett Rickards) assist Oliver in his crusade. Oliver also reconnects with ex-girlfriend, Laurel Lance (Katie Cassidy), who is still angry over his role in her sister, Sara's, presumed death, while her father, Detective Quentin Lance (Paul Blackthorne), suspects Oliver being the vigilante. The season features flashbacks to Oliver's first year on the island, and how it changed him, while trying to stop a mercenary force targeting the Chinese economy. After being saved by The Hood, Roy Harper (Colton Haynes) attempts to find him so he will train him so he can help others.

Production on the pilot began in March 2012 in Vancouver, British Columbia, Canada. Filming for the rest of the season began on July 18, 2012, and ended on April 18, 2013. The season was generally well received by critics, and averaged 3.68million viewers each week. Amell's portrayal of Oliver Queen / Arrow drew comparison to Katniss Everdeen from The Hunger Games, while the season itself was found to be still looking for its own identity. The season would go on to win multiple awards, including twenty-one nominations in various categories. The season was released on DVD and Blu-ray on September 17, 2013. The series was renewed for a second season on February 11, 2013.

Episodes

Cast and characters

Main 
 Stephen Amell as Oliver Queen / The Hood
 Katie Cassidy as Laurel Lance
 Colin Donnell as Tommy Merlyn
 David Ramsey as John Diggle
 Willa Holland as Thea Queen
 Susanna Thompson as Moira Queen
 Paul Blackthorne as Quentin Lance

Recurring 

 Jamey Sheridan as Robert Queen
 Kelly Hu as Chien Na Wei / China White
 Emily Bett Rickards as Felicity Smoak
 John Barrowman as Malcolm Merlyn / Dark Archer
 Jessica De Gouw as Helena Bertinelli / Huntress
 Colin Salmon as Walter Steele
 Annie Ilonzeh as Joanna De La Vega
 Roger Cross as Lucas Hilton
 Byron Mann as Yao Fei
 Janina Gavankar as McKenna Hall
 Manu Bennett as Slade Wilson
 Christie Laing as Carly Diggle
 Colton Haynes as Roy Harper
 Alex Kingston as Dinah Lance
 Jeffrey Nordling as Frank Bertinelli
 Sebastian Dunn as Edward Fyers
 Celina Jade as Shado
 Chin Han as Frank Chen
 Adrian Holmes as Frank Pike
 Jarod Joseph as Alan Durand

Guest 

 Kathleen Gati as Raisa
 Michael Rowe as Floyd Lawton / Deadshot
 Kyle Schmid as Kyle Reston / Ace
 Tahmoh Penikett as Nick Salvati
 Brian Markinson as Adam Hunt
 Jacqueline MacInnes Wood as Sara Lance
 Emma Bell as Emily Nocenti
 Andrew Dunbar as Garfield Lynns / Firefly
 Ben Browder as Ted Gaynor / Blackhawk
 Seth Gabel as Cecil Adams / The Count
 Chelah Horsdal as Kate Spencer
 Currie Graham as Derek Reston / King
 Sarah-Jane Redmond as Mrs. Reston / Queen
 David Anders as Cyrus Vanch
 John Cassini as Russo
 James Callis as Winnick Norton / Dodger
 Danny Nucci as Raynes
 Ona Grauer as Vivian
 Audrey Marie Anderson as Lyla Michaels
 J. August Richards as Mr. Blank / Onomatopoeia

Production 
On January 12, 2012, The CW was preparing a new series centered around the character Green Arrow, developed by Andrew Kreisberg, Greg Berlanti and Marc Guggenheim. A week later, the series, now known as Arrow, was ordered to pilot, which was directed by David Nutter, who also directed the pilot for Smallville, a series following Clark Kent on his journey to become Superman. At the end of the month, Stephen Amell was cast in the titular role of Oliver Queen. When developing the series, producer Marc Guggenheim expressed that the creative team wanted to "chart [their] own course, [their] own destiny", and avoid any direct connections to Smallville, which featured its own Green Arrow/Oliver Queen (Justin Hartley), opting to cast a new actor in the role of Oliver Queen. Unlike with Smallville, the series does not initially feature super-powered heroes and villains. Instead, the creative still took inspiration from Smallville, as one of the main themes of Arrow was to "look at the humanity" of Oliver Queen, as Smallville had done with Clark Kent. The decision not to include superpowers was, in part, based on the executives' desire to take a realistic look at the characters in this universe. The series was given a full season pick up on October 22, 2012.

The series develops relationship triangles: some love triangles, others designed to catch characters in "philosophical debates". Kreisberg provides one such example: "Every week, Oliver will be facing a bad guy, but the truth is, his real nemesis is Detective Lance, who's trying to bring him into justice.[...] His daughter is going to be caught in the middle, because she loves and respects her father, and she's always believed in what he believed, but at the same time, she's going to see this dark urban legend out there that's actually doing a lot of good; the kind of good that she wants to be doing in her role as a legal aid attorney." Learning from previous experiences working in television, the producers worked early on identifying the major story arcs for the series, specifically the first season, including "mapping out" how to accomplish them. Taking inspiration from Christopher Nolan's Batman film series, the creative team decided to "put it all out there" and "not hold back" from episode to episode.

The team strives to include various DC Comics characters and aspects of the DC universe. Guggenheim cited Big Belly Burger, a restaurant franchise introduced in the Superman comics, which appears in Arrow'''s third episode and onward. Kreisberg said, "There are so many characters in the DC Universe who haven't gotten their due in TV and film. We're so excited to reach into [the DC comics] roster and take some of these lesser-known characters that are beloved by fans, and do our spin on the characters."

 Casting 
On January 31, 2012 Stephen Amell became the first actor to be cast, having previously appeared on other CW dramas such as The Vampire Diaries and 90210. Fan reaction to Amell's casting was mixed, with many fans wanting Justin Hartley to reprise his role from Smallville. Amell was one of the first actors to audition for the role of Oliver Queen, and Kreisberg felt that he "hit the target from the outset" and "everyone else just paled in comparison". Arrows pilot script was the first Amell auditioned for during pilot season, having received multiple scripts at the start of the year.
Producer Marc Guggenheim expressed that the creative team wanted to "chart [their] own course, [their] own destiny", and avoid any direct connections to Smallville, which featured its own Green Arrow/Oliver Queen who was portrayed by Hartley. Instead, they opted to cast a new actor in the titular role. Amell, who was already in shape from Rent-a-Goalie, did physical fitness training at Tempest Freerunning Academy out of Reseda, California. He received archery training as well, which included watching a video on how archery has been displayed inaccurately or poorly in television and film before learning the basics of shooting a bow. For Amell, the appeal of portraying Queen was that he saw multiple roles tied to the same character: "There's Queen the casual playboy; Queen the wounded hero; Queen the brooding Hamlet; Queen the lover; Queen the man of action, and so on."
 A week later, David Ramsey was cast as the original character John Diggle, named after the Green Arrow: Year One writer Andy Diggle. Ramsey enjoyed the fact that he did not have to worry about matching the comic books. It allowed him to "just kind of take [his character], and run with it". On February 14, 2012 Susanna Thompson was cast as Moira Queen. The following day, Katie Cassidy and Willa Holland were announced to play Laurel Lance and Thea Queen, respectively. Laurel Lance is an attorney and Oliver's ex-girlfriend, named after Dinah Laurel Lance, who "may or may not end up being the Black Canary with time". Cassidy said she was drawn to the show by Berlanti, Nutter, Kreisberg, and Guggenheim, whom she called smart, creative, and edgy. Hollands' character is described as "Oliver's celebutante younger sister who's testing the boundaries of acceptable behavior". She is partially based on the character Mia Dearden, sharing her middle name, using Mia as an alias in Season 3 and taking the codename "Speedy" in the season 3 finale. Subsequently. Brian Markinson was cast as guest-star villain Adam Hunt, described as "Hunt is a corrupt businessman who is ripping off some people – behavior that has gotten the attention of Dinah Laurel Lance and her CNRI firm". On February 21, 2012, Colin Donnell was cast as Tommy Merlyn, named after Green Arrow's archenemy Merlyn. He is described as "Oliver's best friend, a playboy “trustafarian” who assumes the good times will roll again now that Oliver has returned, only to learn Oliver is a changed man". On March 2, 2012, Paul Blackthorne and Jamey Sheridan were cast as Quentin Lance and Robert Queen, the fathers of Laurel and Oliver respectively, with Blackthorne being the last regular cast member to be cast. Jacqueline MacInnes Wood was cast as Sara Lance, Laurel's sister, for the pilot. However, when the character returned in the second season, Wood was replaced by Caity Lotz. In August, it was announced that John Barrowman would be joining the series in an unspecified recurring role. In the same month Emily Bett Rickards was cast in the role of Felicity Smoak initially as a one-off guest star, but confirmed as a series regular in January 2013.

 Design 
 The realistic approach to the series included the costume design for Oliver's vigilante persona, created by Colleen Atwood. According to Amell, it was important for the suit to be functional, and the best way that he knew for that was if he could put the costume on by himself: "If I can put it on by myself, I think that people will buy it. And that was our idea. That's our world. My boots are actually Nike Frees, which is kind of cool. It's leather and it's tight and it's aggressive, but I can move in it. People will like it." David Nutter, the director of the pilot episode, said that "We're creating a real, believable world in which Oliver Queen can do incredible things. Colleen Atwood's great work on the Arrow costume reflects that effort."

 Filming 
Production on the pilot began in March 2012 in Vancouver, British Columbia, Canada. The series features two distinct timelines, which requires more specific planning in the filming schedule. Filming for the island flashbacks takes place in Vancouver's Whytecliff Park area, near beachfront homes. The production team is tasked with keeping the buildings out of camera frame. Additionally, producer Marc Guggenheim finds the process arduous: "Stephen [Amell] has to wear a wig, and his look has to be changed... there's a lot. It's actually incredibly ambitious to do these flashbacks every week, every single episode. Because like Andrew [Kreisberg] said, it's almost like it's its own show." Hatley Castle, located in Royal Roads University was used for exterior shots for the Queen family mansion. Hatley Castle had previously been used as the Luthor ancestral home in Smallville. Vancouver's Terminal City Ironworks Complex doubles as the exterior for Queen Industrial, Inc, in which Oliver sets up his hideout and later his club Verdant. It has also been used on several other occasions, such as the warehouse in which Oliver and Tommy are kidnapped in the pilot episode, or the base of operations for the Chinese Triad in episode 108 "Vendetta".

Filming for the rest of the season commenced on July 18, 2012, and finalized on April 18, 2013.

 Music 

To compose the score for Arrow, executive producer Greg Berlanti invited Blake Neely, with whom he had first worked with on Everwood, Neely created a score that combined electronic and orchestral cues, varying between action themes and romantic ones. Berlanti told Neely the series would be dark, and the music should be as well. After reading the pilot script, Neely went away to start composing on his own. According to Neely, "Of course, Oliver has his main theme but also sub-themes for the many layers of his character. He and Laurel have a love theme. Mom had a theme for the Undertaking. The bad guys all have themes, which makes it sad for me when one of them dies. So I try not to become attached to bad guy themes. Diggle has a theme. Even the Island itself has a theme." The soundtrack was released on September 17, 2013. It was composed by Blake Neely.

 Release 

 Broadcast 
The season began airing in the United States on The CW on October 10, 2012, and completed its 23-episode run on May 5, 2013.

 Home media Arrow: Season 1 was released as a 5-disc DVD set and as a 9-disc Blu-ray and DVD combo pack set on September 17, 2013, in the United States and September 23, 2013, in the United Kingdom. The DVD and Blu-ray box sets contain additional features, including making-of featurettes, deleted scenes, gag reel, and highlights from the Paley Fest 2012.

 Reception 

 Critical response 
The first season received favorable reviews, with a Metacritic score of 73 out of 100, based on reviews from 25 critics, making it the highest rated CW show in five years. Review aggregator website Rotten Tomatoes calculated an approval rating of 85%, based on 36 reviews. The site's consensus reads: "The CW nails the target with Arrow, a comic book-inspired series that benefits from cinematic action sequences, strong plotting, and intriguing characters."

Mary McNamara of the Los Angeles Times called the series an interesting setup with a quality look, describing Amell as "a poster boy (no doubt literally) for the Katniss Everdeen set." Brian Lowry at Variety described the series as a "handsome but stiff surrogate for Batman that could benefit from sharper execution." In reviewing the final episode of the first season, Alasdair Wilkins of The A.V. Club gave the season as a whole a rating of B+, noting that the show "hasn't quite figured everything out yet, but it's had some standout episodes."

 Ratings Arrows premiere episode drew 4.14million viewers, making it The CW's most-watched telecast of any show on any night in three years, and The CW's most-watched series premiere since The Vampire Diaries in 2009. In its second episode, Arrow became the only new network drama in the 2012–13 season to hold its ratings in both adults 18–34 and adults 18–49 from its premiere to its second week. The first season finished as the 130th ranked show, with an average viewership of 3.68million. In Australia, the premiere received 1.32million viewers, making it the third most-watched broadcast on the network that night. The UK broadcast was the highest-rated telecast of the week on Sky 1, with 1.85million viewers. In Canada, the first episode got 1.32million viewers, making it the fourth most-watched airing of the night and the twenty-third of the week.

 Accolades 

|-
! scope="row" rowspan="2" | 2012
| IGN Awards
| Best TV Hero
| data-sort-value="Amell, Stephen" | Oliver Queen (Stephen Amell)
| 
| 
|-
| Satellite Awards
| Satellite Award for Best Television Series – Genre
| data-sort-value="Arrow" | Arrow| 
| 
|-
! scope="row" rowspan="21" | 2013
| Broadcast Music, Inc.
| BMI Television Music Awards
| data-sort-value="Neely, Blake" | Blake Neely
| 
| 
|-
| rowspan="2" | Canadian Society of Cinematography Awards
| TV Drama Cinematography
| data-sort-value="Winter, Glen" | Glen Winter ("Pilot")
| 
| 
|-
| TV series Cinematography
| data-sort-value="Winter, Glen" | Glen Winter ("Vendetta")
| 
| 
|-
| rowspan="8" | Leo Awards
| Best Casting Dramatic Series
| Coreen Mayrs, Heike Brandstatter ("An Innocent Man")
| 
| 
|-
| rowspan="2" | Best Cinematography Dramatic Series
| data-sort-value="Verheul, Gordon" | Gordon Verheul ("Lone Gunmen")
| 
| 
|-
| data-sort-value="Winter, Glen" | Glen Winter ("Pilot")
| 
| 
|-
| Best Dramatic Series
| Joseph Patrick Finn, Greg Berlanti, Marc Guggenheim, Andrew Kreisberg, Melissa Kellner Berman, Drew Greenberg, Jennifer Lence, Wendy Mericle, Carl Ogawa
| 
| 
|-
| Best Production Design Dramatic Series
| data-sort-value="Hudolin, Richard" | Richard Hudolin ("Pilot")
| 
| 
|-
| rowspan="2" | Best Stunt Coordination Dramatic Series
| data-sort-value="Makaro, J. J." | J. J. Makaro ("Pilot")
| 
| 
|-
| data-sort-value="Makaro, J. J." | J. J. Makaro ("Vertigo")
| 
| 
|-
| Best Visual Effects Dramatic Series
| Jean-Luc Dinsdale, Pauline Burns, Andrew Orloff, Dave Gauthier ("Burned")
| 
| 
|-
| rowspan="2" | NewNowNext Awards
| Best New Indulgence
| data-sort-value="Arrow" | Arrow| 
| 
|-
| Cause You're Hot
| data-sort-value="Amell, Stephen" | Stephen Amell
| 
| 
|-
| People's Choice Awards
| Favorite New TV Drama
| data-sort-value="Arrow" | Arrow| 
| 
|-
| Saturn Awards
| Best Youth-Oriented Series on Television
| data-sort-value="Arrow" | Arrow| 
| 
|-
| rowspan="5" | Teen Choice Awards
| Choice Breakout TV Show
| data-sort-value="Arrow" | Arrow| 
| 
|-
| Choice Breakout TV Star
| data-sort-value="Amell, Stephen" | Stephen Amell
| 
| 
|-
| Choice Sci-Fi/Fantasy TV Actor
| data-sort-value="Amell, Stephen" | Stephen Amell
| 
| 
|-
| Choice Sci-Fi/Fantasy TV Actress
| data-sort-value="Cassidy, Katie" | Katie Cassidy
| 
| 
|-
| Choice Sci-Fi/Fantasy TV Show
| data-sort-value="Arrow" | Arrow''
| 
| 
|-
| UBCP/ACTRA Awards
| Best Newcomer
| data-sort-value="Rickards, Emily Bett" | Emily Bett Rickards
| 
| 
|}

Notes

References

External links 

 
 

Arrow (TV series) seasons
2012 American television seasons
2013 American television seasons
Television series set in 2007
Television series set in 2008